Schistura laterimaculata is a species of ray-finned fish in the genus Schistura found in Thailand. This species may be a junior synonym of Schistura nicholsi

References

L
Fish described in 1990